A field hospital is a temporary hospital or mobile medical unit that takes care of casualties on-site before they can be safely transported to more permanent facilities. This term was initially used in military medicine (such as the Mobile Army Surgical Hospital or MASH), but it has also been used to describe alternate care sites used in disasters and other emergency situations. 

A field hospital is a medical staff with a mobile medical kit and, often, a wide tent-like shelter (at times an inflatable structure in modern usage) so that it can be readily set up near the source of casualties. In an urban environment, the field hospital is often established in an easily accessible and highly visible building (such as restaurants, schools, hotels and so on). In the case of an airborne structure, the mobile medical kit is often placed in a normalized container; the container itself is then used as shelter. A field hospital is generally larger than a temporary aid station but smaller than a permanent military hospital.

International humanitarian law such as the Geneva Conventions include prohibitions on attacking doctors, ambulances, hospital ships, or field hospitals buildings displaying a Red Cross, a Red Crescent or other emblem related to the International Red Cross and Red Crescent Movement; deliberately attacking or otherwise causing harm on these health facilities (especially during warfare or armed conflicts) may constitute a war crime. 

Field hospitals are also prevalent in the event of disease outbreaks and pandemics. The ongoing COVID-19 pandemic led to the establishment of field hospitals in many parts of the world, especially in the developing world.

By country

France 

Field hospitals in France are managed by the SAMU (French emergency medical service). Two types of mobile medical kits (poste sanitaire mobile or PSM) are used:

 The level one mobile medical kit (PSM1): it can handle 25 heavy casualties on any type of ground; it is made of about 400 kg of equipment and drugs placed in 10 tanks, with also logistic equipment (trailer, inflatable tent, lighting, generating unit); there are 42 PSM1 in France;
 The level two mobile medical kit (PSM2): it can handle resuscitation care for 500 patients; it is made of 8 tons of equipment and drugs (200 references) in 150 tanks, it can be divided ( is possible to set up several sub-fracedPSM2); in addition to the usual logistic equipment of the PSM1, the PSM2 has a tactical radio network and a management computer system. There are 21 PSM2 in France.

The PSM are stored in the hospitals where there are samus and smurs.

The PMA is organized in four zones:
 a reception and triage zone, under the responsibility of a sort physician; the casualties  are sorted and dispatched according to the seriousness of their state;
 two zones for medical care:
 Absolute emergencies zone (UA: urgences absolues): prehospital resuscitation unit for very serious cases: extreme emergencies (EU: extrème urgence) and grave injuries (U1);
 Relative emergencies zone (UR: urgences relatives): for the serious (U2) and light injured (U3)
 Mortuary zone (dépot mortuaire) for the deceased casualties. This zone is under the responsibility of the judicial police.

In case of really massive disaster, it is possible to have several PMA; the evacuation goes then not directly to a hospital, but to another big field hospital called "medical evacuation centre" (centre médical d'évacuation, CME), to avoid the saturation of the hospitals.

In case of a red plan, the PMA is under the responsibility of a physician chosen by the director of medical rescue (DSM), and he is assisted by a firefighter officer chosen by the commander of rescue operation (COS). The  firefighter officer has in charge the identification of the living casualties and of the secretaryship. The aim of the PMA is to sort and stabilize the casualties before their evacuation to a hospital.

A similar system can be set up as a preventive measure for some very big events (sport championship, cultural events, concert...), but managed by first aid associations. It is then called an "associative medical post" (poste associatif médicalisé, PAM). (For smaller events, is simple first aid post, with only volunteer certified first responders and no medical staff, is set up.)

The civil defence military units (Unité d'instruction et d'intervention de la sécurité civile, UIISC) have airborne field hospitals. The general system is called DICA (détachement d'intervention de catastrophe aéroporté, i.e. airborne disaster unit), and is specialized in search-and-rescue and in emergency medicine; it can be enhanced by the Fast civil defence medical unit, called ESCRIM (élément de sécurité civile rapide d'intervention médicale). The ESCRIM is a surgical unit (detachement d'appui chirurgical) assisted by a medical assistance unit (DAMHo, détachement d'appui médical et d'hospitalisation); the later is specialized in pre- and post-operation care, and allows 48h of hospitalization. The UIISC also has a PMA (i.e. sort, stabilization and evacuation structure) when the hospital infrastructure of the country is sufficient.

Namibia
The Namibian Defence Force operates a mobile field hospital through its Defence Health Services Directorate. It was donated by the German government to Namibia in March 2013. Initially it was a UN level two hospital but has now been upgraded to level one. The field hospital is containerized in tents, it has capacity to treat forty outpatients per day and can admission capacity of twenty patients. It has two intensive care units, laboratories, an X-ray unit and a mobile oxygen concentrator. The dental department can treat 20 and four operations can be carried out daily. It has its own mobile logistics support wing consisting of kitchens, water purifiers, water tanks, toilet and shower containers, generators and sewage and refuse disposal facilities.

During the COVID-19 pandemic the hospital was deployed to Hosea Kutako International Airport to aid the country's response.

United States 

In the United States Army Medical Department, the term "field hospital" is used as a generic term for a deployable medical facility.  However, from 1906 to the present, with small interruptions, the department has had specific organized units called "Field Hospitals."  These numbered units, for example the 10th Field Hospital have specific tables of organization and equipment, capabilities, and doctrine for their employment, all of which have varied over time.  Readers should take care not to confuse the generic American field hospital with a specific numbered XXth Field Hospital, as the two cannot be used interchangeably. An Evacuation Hospital, a Mobile Army Surgical Hospital (MASH), a Combat support hospital (CSH), a Field Hospital and a numbered General Hospital are all field hospitals—but a MASH, CSH, a General Hospital or a Field Hospital are not interchangeable.

Switzerland 

During the COVID-19 pandemic, the Swiss Armed Forces were mobilised to support civil hospitals in Switzerland. Similar measures were taken in other countries.

See also 

 Aid station
 Argentine Air Force Mobile Field Hospital
 Battalion Aid Station
 Casualty Clearing Station
 Expeditionary Medical Support System
 Forward surgical teams
 Hospital ship
 Portable Surgical Hospital
 Regimental Aid Post
 Shipping container clinic
 List of former United States Army medical units

References

Further reading

External links 

 The Nurses of the 51st Evac Hospital In WWII
 Supplier of field hospitals to the US Army
 Utilis SAS, Designer and Supplier of field hospitals
 SMU's Frank J. Davis World War II Photographs

Military medical installations
Disaster preparedness

Emergency services
Types of health care facilities